Kampab Mantqehi Maghan (also Romanized as Kampāb Manṭqeh'ī Maghān) is a village in Aslan Duz Rural District, Aslan Duz District, Parsabad County, Ardabil Province, Iran. At the 2006 census, its population was 347, in 85 families.

References 

Towns and villages in Parsabad County